Binary betting is a type of financial betting which displays the price of a bet as an odds index from 0 to 100 where the bet settles at 100 if an event happens and 0 if it does not. The greater the likelihood of an event happening the higher this price will be. A price of 91-93, for example, suggests the betting broker which offers the bet believes the event has a 92% likelihood of happening.  An event can be bought or sold, making it possible to profit both from the event occurring or not occurring. A bettor who thinks that the event will occur will buy the bet and a bettor who thinks the event won't occur will sell the bet. An event could be, for example, the "FTSE to close 11 points higher by midday", "the FTSE will end higher on the day", "Brent Oil will close between 50 and 60 cents lower" and so on.

Types of Binary bets

Up/Down - This is the most basic form of binary betting, and the one most bettors will take. A bettor who wishes to buy this bet has to decide if the asset or market will close above or below the current spot price by the end of the trading day.
Rise/Fall
Higher/Lower - Here a trader is betting on the high or low of today being a given distance from yesterday’s closing level.
Touch/No-Touch
In/Out

Calculating winnings and losses
Binary bet winnings and losses are calculated in the following manner:

When BUYING, Profit/Loss = The closing price minus the opening price times your bet size (per point)

When SELLING, Profit/Loss = The opening price minus the closing price times your bet size (per point)

Example One:
The bet is that "the FTSE will close higher on the day".  The price is 38-43.  You BUY (agree with the proposition) at 43 for £5 per point.  The FTSE does close higher on the day, meaning that the bet makes up at 100.  Therefore your winnings are:

      (100 - 43) x £5 = £285

Example Two:
The same bet, that "the FTSE will close higher on the day".  The price is 38-43.  You BUY (agree with the proposition) at 43 for £5 per point.  The FTSE does NOT close higher on the day, meaning that the bet makes up at 0.  Therefore your winnings - or losses in this case - are:

     (0 - 43) x £5 = -£215

Example Three:
The same bet, that "the FTSE will close higher on the day".  The price is 38-43.  You SELL (disagree with the proposition) at 38 for £5 per point.  The FTSE does NOT close higher on the day, meaning that the bet makes up at 0.  Therefore your winnings are:

     (38 - 0) x £5 = £190

Floating or Fixed Binaries?
A Floating Binary is the most common type of binary bet.  It is a bet where the binary price moves but the strike price (the price the market needs to reach for the event to occur and therefore make up at either 100 or 0) is fixed.
For example, if the bet is "Brent Oil will end down on the day" the Buy and Sell prices will change throughout the course of the bet, but the proposition itself will remain the same.

A Fixed Binary is a bet where the binary price remains fixed but the strike price (the price the market needs to reach for the event to occur and therefore make up at 100) is moving.
For example, if the bet is that "GBP/USD will end up 25 points by the end of the betting period", and you can buy this at 95, the buy price would remain at 95 though the target price for the bet might change to GBP/USD being up 21 then 19 then 13 then 7 etc.

Floating and Fixed Binary bets are fundamentally distinct. With Floating Binaries the buy and sell prices float whilst the target price remains static. With Fixed Binaries the buy and sell prices remain fixed whilst the target price moves.

Closing Out a floating binary bet
A Floating Binary bet - and only a Floating Binary bet - can be closed out before the end of the lifetime of the bet.  This allows you to take an early profit or cut your losses if the bet is going against you. If you bought you can sell the same amount to close, or if you sold you can buy the same amount to close.
 
Further, you can perform a partial close where you buy or sell less than you originally sold or bought, therefore leaving part of the bet running.

For example, we may offer a price of 32-35 for "the FTSE to finish up at the end of the day".  You think the FTSE will rise, so you Buy at 35 for £10 a point. Later in the day the FTSE has risen and we are now offering a price of 80-83.  To close this bet and take an early profit you would Sell at 80 points for the same bet size, ie £10 a point.

Your profit on the bet would be (80 - 35) x £10 = £450.

Further reading
John Piper (2007). "Binary Betting", Harriman House. .
Douglas Gallagher (2008). "Financial Betting For Dummies", John Wiley & Sons, Ltd. .
John Piper (2009). "Binary Trading", Harriman House. .

References

Gambling terminology
Wagering
Financial markets